Artem Frolov (born ) is a Ukrainian male  track cyclist, riding for the national team. He competed in the team sprint event at the 2010 UCI Track Cycling World Championships.

References

External links
 Profile at cyclingarchives.com

1988 births
Living people
Ukrainian track cyclists
Ukrainian male cyclists
Place of birth missing (living people)
21st-century Ukrainian people